Maidwell is a village and civil parish in West Northamptonshire in England. At the time of the 2001 census, the parish had 325 inhabitants, including Draughton, and this increased to 429 at the 2011 census.

The villages name means 'Maidens' spring/stream'.

Location

Notable buildings
The Historic England website contains details of a total of nine listed buildings in the parish of Maidwell, all of which are Grade II apart from St Mary the Virgin's Church, which is Grade II*. They include the following:
Church of St Mary the Virgin, Draughton Road
Maidwell Hall The hall is used as an independent boys and girls boarding and day preparatory school for children from 8–13 years old. The school was founded in 1911 and moved to its current location in 1933. Its notable alumni include Adam Butler, the politician and John Ailwyn Fellowes, 4th Baron de Ramsey a landowner, agriculturalist and first chairman of the Environment Agency. The oldest part of the building is the porch, 1637. On 16 February 1895, the hall was completely destroyed by fire. The event is commemorated by stained glass windows in the south aisle of St Mary's from Sir Reginald Bernard Loder. Sir Reginald married Lady Margaret Hare, daughter of the Earl of Listowel later the same year. in 1899 Sir Reginald was High Sheriff of Northamptonshire. The hall was rebuilt in 1902. Loder died in 1931.
Old Bakehouse, Draughton Road
Old House, Harborough Road
Old Rectory, Draughton Road

Railway
Lamport railway station on the Northampton and Market Harborough railway opened on 16 February 1859 serving Maidwell as well as other nearby villages. The line closed to passenger traffic in 1960, and later completely closed to all traffic.

References

External links 

Villages in Northamptonshire
West Northamptonshire District
Civil parishes in Northamptonshire